Wattana Playnum (born August 19, 1989), simply known as Mike, is a Thai professional footballer who plays as a defensive midfielder.

Club career

Wattana Playnum played for Nakhon Sawan during 2009-10. In the next season, he was bought by Paknampho NSRU and played there during 2011-12. Subsequently, Phil Stubbins, Ayutthaya head coach at that time, brought him to join Ayutthaya in 2013. In December 2014, one of the biggest teams in Thailand, Muangthong United, which had shown an interest in his potentials, purchased him from Ayutthaya. Throughout the 2015 season, he was loaned out to Pattaya United, implicitly an allied club to Muangthong United. He helped Pattaya United finish second in 2015 Thai Division 1 League, awarded promotion to 2016 Thai League T1. Since 2016, he was back to and has been playing for Muangthong United.

International career

In March 2017, Wattana made his senior international debut appearing in the starting lineup in the 2018 world cup qualification match against Japan at Saitama Stadium.

Honours

International
Thailand
 King's Cup (1): 2017

Club
Muangthong United
 Thai League 1 (1): 2016
 Thai League Cup (2): 2016, 2017
 Thailand Champions Cup (1): 2017
 Mekong Club Championship (1): 2017

Uthai Thani
Thai League 3 (1): 2021–22
Thai League 3 Northern Region (1): 2021–22

References

External links
Wattana Playnum profile at Muangthong United website

1989 births
Living people
Wattana Playnum
Wattana Playnum
Association football midfielders
Wattana Playnum
Wattana Playnum
Wattana Playnum
Wattana Playnum
Wattana Playnum
Wattana Playnum
Wattana Playnum